Şəhriyar is a village and municipality in the Shamakhi Rayon of Azerbaijan. It has a population of 2,033.

It was formed in 1999 through detaching a neighbourhood from the city of Shamakhi and merging it with the nearby village of Kələxana.

References

Populated places in Shamakhi District